The List of Trichoderma species contains the following accepted species within the fungal genus Trichoderma:

Trichoderma achlamydosporum
Trichoderma acremonioides
Trichoderma adaptatum
Trichoderma aeroaquaticum
Trichoderma aerugineum
Trichoderma aestuarinum
Trichoderma aethiopicum
Trichoderma afarasin
Trichoderma afroharzianum
Trichoderma aggregatum
Trichoderma aggressivum
Trichoderma albofulvopsis
Trichoderma albolutescens
Trichoderma alboviride
Trichoderma alni
Trichoderma alpinum
Trichoderma alutaceum
Trichoderma amazonicum
Trichoderma amoenum
Trichoderma anaharzianum
Trichoderma andinense
Trichoderma angustum
Trichoderma anisohamatum
Trichoderma appalachiense
Trichoderma applanatum
Trichoderma aquaticum
Trichoderma arachnoidea
Trichoderma arenarium
Trichoderma arundinaceum
Trichoderma asiaticum
Trichoderma asperelloides
Trichoderma asperellum
Trichoderma asymmetricum
Trichoderma atlanticum
Trichoderma atrobrunneum
Trichoderma atroviride
Trichoderma attinorum
Trichoderma auranteffusum
Trichoderma aurantioeffusum
Trichoderma aureoviride
Trichoderma aureum
Trichoderma austriacum
Trichoderma austrokoningii
Trichoderma awajun
Trichoderma azevedoi
Trichoderma balearicum
Trichoderma bannaense
Trichoderma barbatum
Trichoderma bavaricum
Trichoderma beijingense
Trichoderma beinartii
Trichoderma bifurcatum
Trichoderma bissettii
Trichoderma bomiense
Trichoderma botryosum
Trichoderma brassicae
Trichoderma breve
Trichoderma brevicompactum
Trichoderma brevicrassum
Trichoderma brevipes
Trichoderma brunneoviride
Trichoderma byssinum
Trichoderma caeruleimontis
Trichoderma caeruleoviride
Trichoderma caesareum
Trichoderma caesium
Trichoderma calamagrostidis
Trichoderma camelliae
Trichoderma camerunense
Trichoderma candidum
Trichoderma capillare
Trichoderma caribbaeum
Trichoderma carneum
Trichoderma catoptron
Trichoderma ceciliae
Trichoderma centrosinicum
Trichoderma ceraceum
Trichoderma ceramicum
Trichoderma ceratophylli
Trichoderma cerinum
Trichoderma changbaiense
Trichoderma chetii
Trichoderma chlamydosporicum
Trichoderma chlorosporum
Trichoderma christianii
Trichoderma chromospermum
Trichoderma cinnabarinum
Trichoderma cinnamomeum
Trichoderma citrinella
Trichoderma citrinoviride
Trichoderma compactum
Trichoderma composticola
Trichoderma concentricum
Trichoderma confertum
Trichoderma confluens
Trichoderma cordobense
Trichoderma corfecianum
Trichoderma cornu-damae
Trichoderma crassum
Trichoderma cremeoides
Trichoderma cremeum
Trichoderma croceum
Trichoderma crystalligenum Jaklitsch (2006)
Trichoderma crystalligenum W.T. Qin & W.Y. Zhuang (2017)
Trichoderma cuenisporum
Trichoderma cyanodichotomus
Trichoderma dacrymycellum
Trichoderma delicatulum
Trichoderma deliquescens
Trichoderma densum
Trichoderma desrochii
Trichoderma dimorphum
Trichoderma dingleyeae
Trichoderma dorotheae
Trichoderma dubium
Trichoderma effusum
Trichoderma eijii
Trichoderma endophyticum
Trichoderma epimyces
Trichoderma erinaceum
Trichoderma estonicum
Trichoderma europaeum
Trichoderma euskadiense
Trichoderma evansii
Trichoderma fasciculatum
Trichoderma fassatiovae
Trichoderma fertile
Trichoderma flagellatum
Trichoderma flavescens
Trichoderma flavofuscum
Trichoderma flavum
Trichoderma floccosum
Trichoderma fomiticola
Trichoderma fujianense
Trichoderma fuscum
Trichoderma gamsii
Trichoderma ganodermatis
Trichoderma gansuanum
Trichoderma gelatinosum
Trichoderma ghanense
Trichoderma gillesii
Trichoderma gliocladium
Trichoderma globoides
Trichoderma gracile
Trichoderma grande
Trichoderma granulosum
Trichoderma gregarium
Trichoderma guizhouense
Trichoderma guttatum
Trichoderma hainanense
Trichoderma hamatum
Trichoderma harzianum
Trichoderma hausknechtii
Trichoderma hebeiense
Trichoderma helicolixii
Trichoderma helicum
Trichoderma hengshanicum'Trichoderma hongkongenseTrichoderma hubeienseTrichoderma hunanenseTrichoderma hunuaTrichoderma hypoxylonTrichoderma inaequilateraleTrichoderma inconspicuumTrichoderma ingratumTrichoderma inhamatumTrichoderma insigneTrichoderma intricatumTrichoderma istrianumTrichoderma italicumTrichoderma ivorienseTrichoderma jaklitschiiTrichoderma junciTrichoderma konilangbraTrichoderma koningiiTrichoderma koningiopsisTrichoderma koreanumTrichoderma kunmingenseTrichoderma lacteumTrichoderma laeveTrichoderma laevisporumTrichoderma lanuginosumTrichoderma lateritioroseumTrichoderma leguminosarumTrichoderma lentiformeTrichoderma lentinulaeTrichoderma lentissimumTrichoderma leucopusTrichoderma liberatumTrichoderma lieckfeldtiaeTrichoderma limoniumTrichoderma linzhienseTrichoderma lixiiTrichoderma longibrachiatumTrichoderma longiphialidicumTrichoderma longipileTrichoderma longisporumTrichoderma luteffusumTrichoderma luteocrystallinumTrichoderma luteoeffusumTrichoderma mangshanicumTrichoderma margaretenseTrichoderma martialeTrichoderma mediterraneumTrichoderma medusaeTrichoderma melanomagnumTrichoderma mienumTrichoderma minutisporumTrichoderma minutumTrichoderma moravicumTrichoderma neokoningiiTrichoderma neorufoidesTrichoderma neosinenseTrichoderma neotropicaleTrichoderma nigrovirensTrichoderma nothescensTrichoderma novae-zelandiaeTrichoderma oblongisporumTrichoderma obovatumTrichoderma oligosporumTrichoderma olivascensTrichoderma ovalisporumTrichoderma pachypallidumTrichoderma panacisTrichoderma paraceramosusTrichoderma parareeseiTrichoderma pararogersoniiTrichoderma paratrovirideTrichoderma paravirideTrichoderma paraviridescensTrichoderma parepimycesTrichoderma parestonicumTrichoderma paucisporum'
Trichoderma peberdyi
Trichoderma pedunculatum
Trichoderma penicillatum
Trichoderma peruvianum
Trichoderma perviride
Trichoderma petersenii
Trichoderma pezizoideum
Trichoderma phayaoense
Trichoderma phellinicola
Trichoderma phyllostachydis
Trichoderma piluliferum
Trichoderma pinnatum
Trichoderma placentula
Trichoderma pleuroti
Trichoderma pleuroticola
Trichoderma pluripenicillatum
Trichoderma pollinicola
Trichoderma polyalthiae
Trichoderma polypori
Trichoderma polysporum
Trichoderma poronioideum
Trichoderma priscilae
Trichoderma propepolypori
Trichoderma protrudens
Trichoderma pruinosum
Trichoderma pseudoasiaticum
Trichoderma pseudoasperelloides
Trichoderma pseudocandidum
Trichoderma pseudodensum
Trichoderma pseudogelatinosa
Trichoderma pseudokoningii
Trichoderma pseudolacteum
Trichoderma pseudonigrovirens
Trichoderma pseudostraminea
Trichoderma psychrophilum
Trichoderma pubescens
Trichoderma purpureum
Trichoderma pyramidale
Trichoderma pyrenium
Trichoderma pyrenium
Trichoderma racemosum
Trichoderma reesei
Trichoderma restrictum
Trichoderma rifaii
Trichoderma rogersonii
Trichoderma roseum
Trichoderma rossicum
Trichoderma rosulatum
Trichoderma rubi
Trichoderma rubropallens
Trichoderma rufobrunneum
Trichoderma rugosum
Trichoderma rugulosum
Trichoderma samuelsii
Trichoderma saturnisporopsis
Trichoderma saturnisporum
Trichoderma scalesiae
Trichoderma scorpioideum
Trichoderma sempervirentis
Trichoderma seppoi
Trichoderma shaoguanicum
Trichoderma shennongjianum
Trichoderma sichuanense
Trichoderma silvae-virgineae
Trichoderma simile
Trichoderma simmonsii
Trichoderma simplex
Trichoderma sinense
Trichoderma sinoaustrale
Trichoderma sinokoningii
Trichoderma sinoluteum
Trichoderma sinuosum
Trichoderma solani
Trichoderma solum
Trichoderma songyi
Trichoderma sparsum
Trichoderma speciosum
Trichoderma sphaerosporum
Trichoderma spirale
Trichoderma stercorarium
Trichoderma stilbohypoxyli
Trichoderma stipitatum
Trichoderma stramineum
Trichoderma strictipile
Trichoderma strigosellum
Trichoderma strigosum
Trichoderma stromaticum
Trichoderma subalni
Trichoderma subalpinum
Trichoderma subazureum
Trichoderma subeffusum
Trichoderma subiculoides
Trichoderma subsulphureum
Trichoderma subuliforme
Trichoderma subviride
Trichoderma supraverticillatum
Trichoderma surrotundum
Trichoderma sympodianum
Trichoderma taiwanense
Trichoderma tardum
Trichoderma tawa
Trichoderma taxi
Trichoderma tenue
Trichoderma texanum
Trichoderma thailandicum
Trichoderma thelephoricola
Trichoderma theobromicola
Trichoderma thermophilum
Trichoderma tiantangzhaiense
Trichoderma tibetense
Trichoderma tibeticum
Trichoderma tomentosum
Trichoderma tremelloides
Trichoderma trixiae
Trichoderma tropicosinense
Trichoderma turrialbense
Trichoderma uncinatum
Trichoderma undatipile
Trichoderma undulatum
Trichoderma valdunense
Trichoderma varians
Trichoderma velutinum
Trichoderma vermifimicola
Trichoderma vermipilum
Trichoderma verticillatum
Trichoderma vinosum
Trichoderma violaceum
Trichoderma virens
Trichoderma virgatum
Trichoderma viridarium
Trichoderma viride Pers. (1794)
Trichoderma viride Schumach. (1803)
Trichoderma viridescens
Trichoderma viridialbum
Trichoderma viridicollare
Trichoderma viridiflavum
Trichoderma viridulum
Trichoderma virilente
Trichoderma voglmayrii
Trichoderma vulgatum
Trichoderma vulpinum
Trichoderma xanthum
Trichoderma xixiacum
Trichoderma yui
Trichoderma yunnanense
Trichoderma zayuense
Trichoderma zelobreve
Trichoderma zeloharzianum
Trichoderma zonatum

References

External links

 
Trichoderma